Arthur Herzog Jr. (December 13, 1900 in New York City – September 1, 1983 in Detroit, Michigan) was a songwriter and composer.

Career
Herzog was most known for work with Billie Holiday. He co-wrote several jazz songs she popularized, including "Don't Explain", "God Bless the Child" and "Some Other Spring". He was the father of novelist Arthur Herzog and grandfather to Amy Herzog.

References

External links
[ All Music page]

American jazz songwriters
American male songwriters
1900 births
1983 deaths
20th-century American composers
20th-century American male musicians
American male jazz musicians